Team Esbjerg is a women's handball team based in Esbjerg, Denmark, that competes in the Bambusa Kvindeligaen and the 2022–23 Women's EHF Champions League. They play their home matches in Blue Water Dokken, which have capacity for 2,996 spectators. They play games in red shirts and black shorts.

The coaching team consists of former national team player Jesper Jensen and the Dutch Assistant coach Ana Razdorov-Lyø.

History 
Team Esbjerg was founded in 1991, as a cooperation between KVIK Esbjerg and Esbjerg Håndboldklub (EHK).  They compete the Danish Handball League for the first time in 1999, but they relegated the following year. They have been part of the league, since 2004.

They have won the Danish Championship twice. Once in 2016, after beating FC Midtjylland Håndbold in the final. They lost the first final match 20–17, but won the second 24–19, after a dramatic penalty shootout. Again in 2019, they also beat Herning-Ikast Håndbold, in two matches, with the scores 28–20 and 19–20. They also won the Danish Women's Handball Cup in 2017, after beating København Håndbold, with the score 31–20.

Over time, the club has had many notable and significant players, like Rikke Zachariassen, Ulrika Toft Hansen, Lotte Grigel, Gøril Snorroeggen, Maibritt Kviesgaard, Kari Aalvik Grimsbø, Emily Stang Sando, Marta Mangué, Laura van der Heijden, Angelica Wallén, Ida Bjørndalen and Sandra Toft Galsgaard.

Kits

Honours
EHF Champions League:
Semifinalist: 2022
EHF Cup:
Silver: 2014, 2019
Danish Championship:
Gold: 2016, 2019, 2020
Silver: 2015, 2022
Danish Cup
Winner: 2017, 2021
Silver: 2011
Bronze: 2018

Arena 
Arena: Blue Water Dokken 
City: Esbjerg 
Capacity: 2,996
Address: Gl. Vardevej 82, 6700 Esbjerg

Team

Current squad
Squad for the 2022–23 season.

Goalkeepers  
 12  Anna Kristensen
 16  Amalie Milling
 23  Dinah Eckerle (pregnant)
Wingers 
LW
 17  Beyza Irem Türkoglu
 24  Sanna Solberg-Isaksen
RW
 5  Caroline Gade
 20  Marit Røsberg Jacobsen 
 27  Anne Tolstrup Petersen
Line players
 3  Kaja Kamp
 10  Kathrine Heindahl 
 51  Vilde Ingstad

Back players
LB
 14  Kristine Breistøl 
 25  Henny Reistad
CB
 4  Michala Møller
 33  Julie Bøe Jacobsen
RB
 9  Nora Mørk 
 18  Mette Tranborg

Transfers

Transfers for the season 2023–24

 Joining
  Anna Kristensen (GK) (from  Viborg HK, with immediate effect)
  Rikke Iversen (LP) (from  Odense Håndbold) 

 Leaving
  Vilde Ingstad (LP) (to  CSM București)
  Rikke Poulsen (GK) (Retired as of February 2023)
  Julie Bøe Jacobsen (CB) (to ?)
  Beyza Irem Türkoglu (LW) (to ?)

Transfers for the season 2024–25

 Joining

 Leaving
  Jesper Jensen (Head Coach)

Technical staff
  Head Coach: Jesper Jensen
  Assistant coach: Ana Razdorov-Lyø
  Sportdirector: Thomas Hylle
  Team Leader: Helle Kongsbak
  Physiotherapist: Kenneth Hansen
  Physiotherapist: Jacob Dejgaard
  Video man: Jes Juncker-Jensen

Known former players from the club

  Sandra Toft (2017–2019)
  Rikke Poulsen (2019–2023)
  Stine Bodholt Nielsen (2014–2016)
  Rikke Schmidt (2012–2014)
  Lotte Grigel (2008–2015)
  Maibritt Kviesgaard (2013–2018)
  Rikke Zachariassen (2006–2018)
  Annette Jensen (2018–2022)
  Maria Mose Vestergaard (2014–2019)
  Elma Halilcevic (2017–2021)
  Kari Aalvik Grimsbø (2010–2015)
  Vilde Ingstad (2016–2023)
  Marit Malm Frafjord (2018–2022)
  Siri Seglem (2007–2009)
  Emily Stang Sando (2013–2017) 
  Gøril Snorroeggen (2010–2013)
  Betina Riegelhuth (2015–2016)
  Ida Bjørndalen Karlsson (2014–2018)
  Ine Karlsen Stangvik (2017–2018)
  Rikke Granlund (2018–2021)
  Johanna Ahlm (2013–2015)
  Angelica Wallén (2010–2013)
  Filippa Idéhn (2015–2017)
  Jenny Alm (2015–2017) 
  Jessica Helleberg (2011–2013)
  Anna-Maria Johansson (2009–2011)
  Ulrika Toft Hansen (2015–2018)
  Clara Monti Danielsson (2018–2020)
  Marta Mangué (2007–2011)
  Lara González Ortega (2016–2018)
  Nerea Pena (2020–2021)
  Estavana Polman (2013–2022)
  Laura van der Heijden (2014–2017)
  Katarina Tomašević (2007–2009)
  Kristina Liščević (2017–2019)
  Arna Sif Pálsdóttir (2010–2011)
  Rut Arnfjörð Jónsdóttir (2017–2020)
  Paule Baudouin (2008–2010)
  Mouna Chebbah (2008–2010)
  Sonja Frey (2019–2021)
  Kelsi Fairbrother (2010–2013)
  Beyza Irem Türkoglu (2021–2023)

Statistics

Top scorers in the EHF Champions League 
Last updated on 19 March 2023

Individual awards in the EHF Champions League

Head coach history

European record

Champions League

EHF Cup

EHF Cup Winners' Cup

References

External links
Team Esbjerg's home page 
History of Team Esbjerg 

Danish handball clubs
1991 establishments in Denmark
Esbjerg
Handball clubs established in 1991